Ptychochromis makira is a species of cichlid only known from the Antainambalana River in the northernmost part of the Toamasina Province in Madagascar. It is threatened by habitat loss and overfishing, and has suffered a severe decline in recent years. It reaches a length of  SL.

References

makira
Fish described in 2006